The Acarosporaceae are a family of fungi in the order Acarosporales. Members of this family have a widespread distribution, and are mostly lichenized with green algae. According to a 2021 estimate, the family contains 11 genera and about 260 species. The family is characterised by a  formed of paraphysoids (hyphal structures similar in function to true paraphyses, but often branched and forming a network).

Phylogeny
Formerly classified in the fungal order Lecanorales, phylogenetic analyses in 1998 suggested that the Acarosporaceae belong outside this order; further analysis supported this conclusion. The Acarosporaceae is the most basal family in the division Lecanoromycetes.

Description
Most members of the Acarosporaceae are lichenised, although a rare few are lichenicolous. The form of the thallus ranges from crustose to squamulose to -somewhat umbilicate. The ascomata are in the form of apothecia, which are usually immersed in the thallus. The photobiont partner is chlorococcoid (i.e., green algae from the family Chlorococcaceae). Various lichen products have been reported in the family, including depsides, depsidones, and derivatives of pulvinic acid. Most Acarosporaceae species grow on land or on rock.

Genera
These are the genera that are in the Acarosporaceae (including estimated number of species in each genus, totalling 261 species), according to a 2021 review of fungal classification. Following the genus name is the taxonomic authority (those who first circumscribed the genus; standardized author abbreviations are used), year of publication, and the estimated number of species.
 Acarospora  – ca. 200 spp.
 Caeruleum  – 2 spp.
 Glypholecia  – 3 spp.
 Lithoglypha  – 1 sp.
 Myriospora  – ca. 10 spp.
 Neoacrodontiella  – 1 sp.
 Pleopsidium  – 4 spp.
 Polysporina  – 10 spp.
 Sarcogyne  – ca. 30 spp.
 Timdalia  – 1 sp.
 Trimmatothelopsis  – 11 spp.

References

Acarosporales
Lichen families
Lecanoromycetes families
Taxa named by Abramo Bartolommeo Massalongo
Taxa described in 1852